James C. Jarvis (born March 3, 1943) is an American former basketball player and coach. He played professionally in the American Basketball Association (ABA) and later coached at the NCAA Division I level for the University of Idaho.

Early years
Born in Caldwell, Idaho, Jarvis' parents were Curtis E. and Margaret Helen (Mumford) Jarvis. His father was a high school basketball head coach, first at Caldwell High. In the early 1950s, the family moved from Caldwell to Coquille, Oregon, where Curt coached at Coquille High School. He later moved to Roseburg High School when Jim was a high school sophomore.

A point guard, Jarvis played collegiately at Oregon State University in Corvallis, where he helped the Beavers win the NCAA West Regional championship in 1963 and earn their first Final Four appearance. An honorable mention All-American as a senior in 1965, Jarvis also played baseball for the Beavers, and had a brief career as an infielder in the minor leagues in 1966.
He was later the golf coach at Oregon State for a season in 1971.

Pro career
Jarvis was selected by the San Francisco Warriors of the National Basketball Association in the sixth round (45th overall) of the 1965 NBA draft, but was cut by the team. Jarvis never played in the NBA, but did spend three seasons in the ABA as a member of the Pittsburgh / Minnesota Pipers and Los Angeles Stars.  He was a member of the 1967–68 Pittsburgh Pipers team that won the 1968 ABA Championship.

Coaching
In 1971, Jarvis was hired as the head basketball coach at Spokane Falls Community College in Spokane. After three seasons, he was hired by the University of Idaho in Moscow in March 1974, following the resignation of eight-year head coach Wayne Anderson after the elimination of full-time assistant coaches. The Vandals had finished no higher than sixth place in the Big Sky for the three previous seasons. After four seasons, all with last place finishes in the conference, Jarvis resigned in June 1978 under recurring allegations of illegal recruiting. The program had been placed on probation  for one year in January, resulting in a reprimand for Jarvis and his assistant coach by the university.

Jarvis was succeeded in August by Idaho alumnus Don Monson, who had significantly greater success, taking the Vandals to consecutive conference titles in 1981 and 1982, a top ten ranking, and advancement to the NCAA Sweet Sixteen.

After coaching at Idaho, Jarvis returned to Oregon and worked in real estate in Bend.

Career coaching record

References

External links

Sports-Reference.com – Jim Jarvis – coaching record
Baseball-Reference – Jim Jarvis
Oregon Sports Hall of Fame – Jim Jarvis
Oregon State University Athletics Hall of Fame – Jim Jarvis

1943 births
Living people
American men's basketball players
Basketball coaches from Oregon
Basketball players from Oregon
College men's basketball head coaches in the United States
Idaho Vandals men's basketball coaches
Junior college men's basketball coaches in the United States
Los Angeles Stars players
Minnesota Pipers players
Oregon State Beavers men's basketball players
Parade High School All-Americans (boys' basketball)
People from Coquille, Oregon
Pittsburgh Pipers players
Point guards
San Francisco Warriors draft picks
Sportspeople from Roseburg, Oregon